The 1976 Atlantic Coast Conference baseball tournament was held at Tiger Field in Clemson, South Carolina, from April 22 through 25. Clemson won the tournament and earned the Atlantic Coast Conference's automatic bid to the 1976 NCAA Division I baseball tournament.

Tournament

See also
College World Series
NCAA Division I Baseball Championship

References

2007 ACC Baseball Media Guide

Tournament
Atlantic Coast Conference baseball tournament
Atlantic Coast Conference baseball tournament
Atlantic Coast Conference baseball tournament
College baseball tournaments in South Carolina
Sports competitions in Clemson, South Carolina